Daxu is a town in Baohe District, Hefei, Anhui Province, China. , it administers the following 15 villages:
Nandou Village
Xiaonan Village
Xuxi Village
Shenfu Village
Xiaoxing Village
Xuetang Village
Xugui Village
Donglin Village
Xinmin Village
Ciyun Village
Yudun Village
Huanggang Village
Yinghe Village
Motan Village
Xinhe Village

References

Hefei
Township-level divisions of Anhui